Chamras Saewataporn (born in Bangkok, Thailand on December 9, 1955), is an accomplished Thai musician and composer who first turned professional at the age of 18. He began his musical career working in night clubs and later joined one of the Thai bands of that era, "Grand X" (1976–1980). In 1981, he began composing music and started his own band, "The Radio". His debut album was in 1982, Nok Jao Pho Bin (Soaring Bird). Between 1986 and 1997, he composed theme songs for over 100 Thai movies. He is inspired by his beliefs in Buddhism, and began composing music for relaxation, healing and meditation in 1993. He has won numerous domestic and international awards.

Biography
Chamras was born in Bangkok, Thailand on December 9, 1955. Of Chinese heritage, Chamras trained to be an engineer, graduating from Chulalongkorn University. While studying at the university, he worked in restaurants and nightclubs as a musician. He has never received formal training in music, but chose it as a career over engineering.

Chamras has composed more than a thousand songs, of which about a hundred have been used as theme songs in movies. He has won numerous awards, including Best Music at the 32nd Asia-Pacific Film Festival in 1987.

Thailand Oscar-winning theme songs
1986: Nam-sor-sai

1987: Nang-nuan (also won The Best Music from 32nd Asia-Pacific Film Festival, 1987, Taipei) 

1990: Puk-pui

1991: Pieng-rao-mee-rao

1992: Fak-fun-wai-diew-jar-liew-ma-aw

1993: Na-sud-khob-fah

1994: Fun-tid-fai-hua-jai-tid-din

Discography
Soaring Bird
Morning
Season of Life
Whisper of The Wind
Song of Leaf
Music of The Chaophraya River
Piano in The Garden
The Naerunchara River
Nirvana
The River of Forever
The Spell of Whispering
Mother care fairy Child
The Chaophraya River
Piano on The Beach

References

External links
 link www.greenmusic.org

1955 births
Living people
Chamras Saewataporn
Chamras Saewataporn
Chamras Saewataporn
Chamras Saewataporn
Chamras Saewataporn